Otto Altenbach (born 31 May 1948) is a retired German racing driver.
Altenbach was a sports car driver between 1984 and 2001.

References

1948 births
Living people
German racing drivers
24 Hours of Le Mans drivers
World Sportscar Championship drivers
Place of birth missing (living people)